This is a list of instruments by Hornbostel-Sachs number, covering those instruments that are classified under 321.312 under that system. These instruments may be known as spike box lutes or spike guitars.

These instruments may be classified with a suffix, based on how the strings are caused to vibrate.

4: Hammers or beaters
5: Bare hands and fingers
6: Plectrum
7: Bowing
71: Using a bow
72: Using a wheel
73: Using a ribbon
8: Keyboard
9: Using a mechanical drive

References

Notes

321.312
Lute family instruments